The 1997–98 EHF Women's Champions League was the fifth edition of the modern era of the 1961-founded competition for European national champions women's handball clubs, running from 4 October 1997 to 16 May 1998. Hypo Niederösterreich defeated defending champion Mar Valencia in the final to win its seventh title.

Qualifying round

Group stage

Group A

Group B

Group C

Group D

Quarter-finals

Semifinals

Final

References

Women's EHF Champions League
Ehf Women's Champions League, 1997-98
Ehf Women's Champions League, 1997-98
EHF
EHF